The 2012–13 Liga Bet season saw Beitar Nahariya (champions of the North A division), Hapoel Beit She'an/Mesilot (champions of the North B division), Hapoel Mahane Yehuda (champions of the South A division) and Maccabi Be'er Ya'akov (champions of the South B division) win the title and promotion to Liga Alef.

The clubs ranked 2nd to 5th in each division entered a promotion play-off, at the end of which, in the North section Hapoel Iksal lost against Maccabi Kafr Kanna from Liga Alef North and remained in Liga Bet, while, in the South section, F.C. Kafr Qasim won against Hapoel Arad from Liga Alef South and was promoted to Liga Alef.

At the bottom, F.C. Tzeirei Bir al-Maksur (from North A division), Ihud Bnei Baka (from North B division), Shikun Vatikim Ramat Gan (from South A division), and Bnei Yehud (from South B division) were all automatically relegated to Liga Gimel.

The clubs ranked 12th to 15th in each division entered a relegation play-off, at the end of which Hapoel Ahva Haifa (from North A division), F.C. Kfar Kama (from North B division), Gadna Tel Aviv (from South A division) and Hapoel Merhavim (from South B division) dropped to Liga Gimel as well.

North A Division

North B Division

South A Division

South B Division

Promotion play-offs

Northern Divisions

Hapoel Iksal qualified to the promotion play-off match against 14th ranked club in Liga Alef North division, Maccabi Kafr Kanna.

Promotion play-off Match

Maccabi Kafr Kanna remained in Liga Alef; Hapoel Iksal remained in Liga Bet.

Southern Divisions

F.C. Kafr Qasim qualified to the promotion play-off match against 14th ranked club in Liga Alef South division, Hapoel Arad.

Promotion play-off Match

F.C. Kafr Qasim promoted to Liga Alef; Hapoel Arad relegated to Liga Bet.

Relegation play-offs

Northern divisions

North A division

Hapoel Ahva Haifa relegated to Liga Gimel

North B division

F.C. Kfar Kama relegated to Liga Gimel

Southern divisions

South A division

Gadna Tel Aviv relegated to Liga Gimel

South B division

Hapoel Merhavim relegated to Liga Gimel

References
 The Israel Football Association 
 The Israel Football Association 
 The Israel Football Association 
 The Israel Football Association 

Liga Bet seasons
4
Israel